The Westmore Family is a prominent family in Hollywood make-up. Led by their patriarch, George Westmore, the family has had four generations serve Hollywood as make-up artists in various capacities since George's establishment of Hollywood's first make-up department in 1917.

Careers

The English wigmaker George Westmore, for whom the Makeup Artist and Hair Stylist Guild's George Westmore Lifetime Achievement Award is named, founded the first (and tiny) film makeup department, at Selig Polyscope Company in 1917. He also worked at Triangle, but soon was freelancing across the major studios. He understood that cosmetic and hair needs were personal and would make up stars such as Mary Pickford (whom he relieved of having to curl her famous hair daily by making false ringlets) or the Talmadge sisters (Norma and Constance) in their homes before they left for work in the morning.

He fathered three generations of movie makeup artists, beginning with his six sons—Perc, Ern, Monte, Wally, Bud, and Frank—who soon eclipsed him in Hollywood. By 1926, Monte, Perc, Ern, and Bud had penetrated the industry to become the chief makeup artists at four major studios, and all continued to break ground in new beauty and horror illusions until the end of their careers. In 1921, after dishwashing at Famous Players-Lasky, Monte became Rudolph Valentino's sole makeup artist. (The actor had been doing his own.) When Valentino died in 1926, Monte went to Selznick International where, thirteen years later, he worked himself to death with the enormous makeup demands for Gone with the Wind (1939). 

In 1923, Perc established a blazing career at First National-Warner Bros. and, over twenty-seven years, initiated beauty trends and disguises including, in 1939, the faces of Charles Laughton's grotesque The Hunchback of Notre Dame (for RKO) and Bette Davis's eyebrowless, almost bald, whitefaced look in The Private Lives of Elizabeth and Essex. In the early 1920s, he blended Stein Pink greasepaint with eye shadow, preceding Max Factor's Panchromatic. Ern, at RKO from 1929 to 1931 and then at 20th Century Fox from 1935, was adept at finding the right look for stars of the 1930s. Wally headed Paramount makeup from 1926, where he created, among others, Fredric March's gruesome transformation in Dr. Jekyll and Mr. Hyde (1931). Frank followed him there. Bud led Universal's makeup department for twenty-three years, specializing in rubber prosthetics.

Together, they built the House of Westmore salon, which served stars and public alike. Later generations have continued the name, including brothers Michael and Marvin who have excelled in special makeup effects, such as in Blade Runner (1982), Mask (1985) and Raging Bull (1980).

Prominent family members
 George Henry Westmore (June 27, 1879 – July 12, 1931)
 Monte George Westmore (July 22, 1902 – March 30, 1940)
 Monty George Westmore Jr. (June 12, 1923 – November 13, 2007)
 Michael George Westmore (March 22, 1938)
McKenzie Westmore (April 26, 1977)
 Marvin George Westmore (December 24, 1934 – November 28, 2020)
 Kandace Westmore
 Kevin Westmore
 Percival Harry Westmore (October 29, 1904 – September 30, 1970)
 Ernest Henry Westmore (October 29, 1904 – February 1, 1967)
 Walter James Westmore (February 13, 1906 – July 3, 1973)
 Pamela Westmore
 Mark Westmore, A.C.E.
 Bud Westmore (January 13, 1918 – June 24, 1973)
 Frank C. Westmore (April 13, 1923 – May 14, 1985)

Other family members

 Dorothy (1907–1931), daughter of George with his first wife, Ada, who died following an operation.
 Patricia, daughter of George with his second wife, Anita.
 Norma, daughter of Perc and his first wife, Virginia.
 Virginia, daughter of Perc and adopted daughter of his first wife, Virginia. 
 Muriel, daughter of Ern and his first wife, Venida.
 Lynn, daughter of Ern and his second wife, Ethelyne.
 James, son of Wally and his wife, Edwina.
 Ann, daughter of Wally and his wife, Edwina.
 Bridget, daughter of Bud and his second wife, Rosemary.
 Robert, son of Bud and his third wife, Jeanne.
 Melinda, daughter of Bud and his third wife, Jeanne.
 Timothy, son of Bud and his third wife, Jeanne.
 Charles, son of Bud and his third wife, Jeanne.
 Jonas Helstab, son of Melinda, grandson of Bud and third wife, Jeanne.
 Megan Helstab, daughter of Melinda, granddaughter of Bud and his third wife, Jeanne.
 Alexander, grandson of Bud and his third wife, Jeanne.
 Chelsea Helstab, daughter of Melinda, granddaughter of Bud and his third wife, Jeanne.
 Grace, granddaughter of Bud and his third wife, Jeanne.
 Mark, grandson of Wally and his wife, Edwina
 Sharon, daughter of Muriel Westmore Crawley
 Pauleen, daughter of Muriel Westmore Crawley
 Judy, daughter of Muriel Westmore Crawley
 Robert Jr., son of Muriel Westmore Crawley
 Christiana Crawley Benson, great-granddaughter of Ern Westmore. Robert Crawley, Jr. grandson of Ern Westmore

References
 Frank Westmore and Muriel Davidson. The Westmores of Hollywood. J. B. Lippincott, New York City, 1976.

External links
westmoremuseum.com
American families of English ancestry
People from Canterbury
American make-up artists